

Fossils
 The end of a Megalosaurus thighbone, previously misinterpreted by Robert Plot to be the remains of a war elephant brought to Great Britain by the Romans, is subject to further confusion. Richard Brookes publishes a paper naming it Scrotum humanum. Although he meant this name metaphorically to describe the bone's appearance, this idea is taken seriously by French philosopher Jean-Baptiste Robinet, who believed that nature formed fossils in mimicry of portions of the human anatomy- such as the scrotum.

Dinosaurs

Newly named dinosaurs

References

18th century in paleontology
Paleontology